Château des Jacques is a wine producer located in Moulin-à-Vent, in the north of the Beaujolais region. The 88 hectares of vineyards are spread over six appellations located in Moulin-à-Vent, Morgon, Chénas and Fleurie. Vineyards included in the domaine's holdings include: Grand Clos de Rochegrès, Clos du Grand Carquelin, Champ de Cour, La Roche, Clos des Thorins, La Rochelle and Côte du Py.

History 
Since 1996, Château des Jacques has been owned by Maison Louis Jadot, one of the early-stage investors in Beaujolais.

Cyril Chirouze currently runs the wine domain at Château des Jacques.

Reception
In 2016, the Bettane & Desseauve wine guide gave Château des Jacques 3 stars, stating "A viticulture respecting soil life, a meticulous vinification and a balanced ageing. Everything contributes to give great wines from Beaujolais, which will perfectly age in time."

References

Further reading
 

Burgundy wine
French winemakers